Carpenterella may refer to:
 Carpenterella (fungus), a fungus genus in the family Synchytriaceae
 Carpenterella (moth), an insect genus in the subfamily Lymantriinae